Hällas are a Swedish progressive rock band formed in 2011 in Jönköping, Småland, by Tommy Alexandersson and Kasper Eriksson. Currently based in Linköping, Östergötland, they play a blend of progressive rock, hard rock and heavy metal inspired by 1970s bands, resulting in a genre that they call "adventure rock".

The band is named after the main character of the stories they tell in their lyrics; Hällas is a knight living in parallel, medieval universe in which "religion similarly, albeit not necessarily the ones we recognize from here, are very prevalent and where treacherous tyrants reign lands on the verge of the apocalypse and where seers have gained so much strength that they can dictate the future and the past".

History 
The band was founded in 2011 in Jönköping, Småland, by bassist/vocalist Tommy Alexandersson, drummer Kasper Eriksson and a guitarist as a blues rock trio, but they soon started to incorporate elements of 1980s heavy metal and to adopt a more progressive approach to songwriting. After moving to Linköping in Östergötland and splitting with their guitarist, they met guitarists Marcus Petersson and Alexander Moraitis.

They recorded their first EP at Treasuresound Studio (in Jönköping), which is managed by their current keyboardist Nicklas. Back then, he was not a member yet, but was invited to join the group because they wanted to have organs and synthesizers in their music.

After the EP, they toured extensively and started preparing their debut full-length album Excerpts from a Future Past, a conceptual one.

In early 2020, they signed with Napalm Records and released their second album, Conundrum, on 31 January. It was recorded at the Riksmixningsverket in Stockholm and peaked at #42 and #84 at the Swedish and German charts, respectively. The album ends a plot that started on their EP and continued on their debut full-length effort.

In 2020, they were nominated for a P3 Guld Award in the rock/metal category.

In December 2020, they released a video for "Carry On", a track off their second album.

In January 2022, they announced that their third full-length album, titled Isle of Wisdom, would be released on 8 April via Napalm.

Musical style 
Hällas's music has been described as a mixture of progressive rock, hard rock and heavy metal inspired by 1970s bands, resulting in a genre that they call "adventure rock". They cite 1970s progressive rock bands as influences, namely Genesis, Uriah Heep, Cherry Five, Wishbone Ash, Camel, Nektar, Rush, Banco del Mutuo Soccorso and Kebnekajse.

Members use both vintage and modern gear in their performances.

Members
Current members (as of September 2022)
 Tommy Alexandersson – lead vocals, bass
 Alexander Moraitis – guitar
 Marcus Petersson – guitar
 Nicklas Malmqvist – organ, synthesizer
 Kasper Eriksson – drums, percussion

Discography

Studio albums

References

External links
 

Swedish progressive rock groups
Swedish hard rock musical groups
Swedish heavy metal musical groups
Musical groups established in 2011
2011 establishments in Sweden
Napalm Records artists